Dmytro Oleksandrovych Kozatskyi (call sign – Orest; born 11 November 1995) is a Ukrainian photographer, serviceman, senior soldier, and fighter of the Azov Battalion of the National Guard of Ukraine. He was awarded a Medal "For Military Service of Ukraine" (2022).

Biography 
Dmytro Kozatsky was born in Malyn on 11 November 1995.

In 2014 he left the Higher School of Information Technology and Management in Rzeszów (Poland) to become a participant in the Revolution of Dignity. He is currently a student at the Ostroh Academy National University.

In 2015 he joined the National Guard of Ukraine, and later joined the Azov Battalion.

Russian invasion of Ukraine (2022) 
Since 2015, he has been a defender of Mariupol in the Donetsk region. From 1 March 2022, together with other colleagues, he held the defense at the Azovstal plant.

Head of the press service of the Azov Battalion. Author of 10 photos of wounded colleagues from the field hospital at the plant, who flew around the world. One of the photos, in which the young man falls under the rays of the May sun, falling inside the destroyed premises of the enterprise through a hole pierced by shells, was called "Light will win".

To the sound of explosions, he sang the song "Stefania" by the Kalush Orchestra, which brought Ukraine victory in the song contest "Eurovision 2022".

On 20 May 2022, before being taken prisoner, Dmytro Kozatsky published a post on his Twitter: “Well, that's all. Thank you for shelter Azovstal – the place of my death and my life. By the way, while I am in captivity, I will leave you photos in the best quality, send them to all journalistic awards and photo contests, if I win something, it will be very nice after the release. Thank you all for your support. See you.”. On the same day, the Vice Speaker of the Ukrainian Parliament Olena Kondratyuk stated that the Verkhovna Rada of Ukraine would send photos of Dmytro Kozatsky to all parliaments of Europe and the world that are on Ukraine's side. Also, the film association "Babylon'13" published a video of the "Mariupol Fortress. The last day in Azovstal", filmed by Dmitry.

Awards 
 Grand Press Photo 2022
 Prix de la Photographie, Paris, gold prize for press/war, second place winner in press.
 medal "For military service to Ukraine" (April 17, 2022) — "for personal courage and selfless actions related to the protection of the state sovereignty and territorial integrity of Ukraine, loyalty to the military oath"

Controversy 
In October 2022, several photos from Kozatskyi's photo series The Light Will Win were included in an exhibition at the Ferraté Library at the Polytechnic University of Catalonia. On November 13, 2022, Kozatskyi's work was removed from the exhibition and the University released a statement which stated it "wasn't aware of the ideology of the author", and that the university "rejects Nazism and regrets the situation created". Also on November 13, 2022, Kozatskyi was heckled by protestors at Doc NYC where he was an invited speaker. The protestors were forcibly removed.

References

Sources 
 AP PHOTOS: A POW’s legacy of Mariupol siege pictures // East bay times, 21 May 2022
 Natalia Liubchenkova, Azov photographer publishes his work just before being taken prisoner // Euronews, 20 May 2022
 "While I am in captivity": military photographer from "Azovstal" showed photos of Ukrainian defenders // ТСН, 20 May 2022
 “Thank you for the shelter, Azovstal — the place of my death and my life” Soldier Dmytro Kozatsky from Azov Regiment released heartbreaking photos of Mariupol defenders
 Ксюша Савоскіна, «Спочатку йде авіабомбардування, а далі обстріл із кораблів. Це безперервний жах». Історія бійця з «Азовсталі» // hromadske, 17 May 2022
 Ольга Скотнікова, «Очі «Азовсталі» — фотограф Орест, що знімав життя захисників, написав з полону // Вечірній Київ, 20 May 2022
 «Місце моєї смерті і мого життя»: захисник Маріуполя показав прощальні світлини з «Азовсталі» // ТСН, 20 May 2022
 Роліна Мірер, Обличчя «Азовсталі». Історії захисників Маріуполя // Суспільне Новини, 18 May 2022
 «Найстрашніше — це втрата побратимів», — Дмитро Козацький, автор світлин поранених з «Азовсталі» // 1+1, 16 May 2022

External links 
  // 24 канал, 20 May 2022
  // Сніданок з 1+1, 16 May 2022
 Russia-Ukraine war: what we know on day 88 of the invasion // The Guardian, 22 May 2022

Ukrainian photographers
Ukrainian military personnel of the 2022 Russian invasion of Ukraine
Living people
People from Malyn
1995 births